Portrait of an Old Woman is a small oil on wood panel painting by the Early Netherlandish painter Hans Memling, completed c 1475–80, and in the collection of the Museum of Fine Arts, Houston, Texas, since 1944. The panel has obviously been cut down given its tight framing. The woman's face and headdress dominate the remaining pictorial space; they create a strong contrast between her cream headgear and the black background and the lower portion of the painting, which was originally bluish green, but has darkened with age and accumulated dirt. Yet the panel is in good condition following a restoration that replaced lost paint in several areas.

The panel is noted for it dramatic contrasts in light and colour, and for its subtle treatment of skin tones, which are comparable to Memling's c 1472 Portrait of Maria Portinari, in New York.

The painting was obviously at one time a donor wing, either for a diptych or triptych which was at some stage broken apart. It is probably thus related to the Portrait of an Elderly Man now in the Metropolitan Museum of Art, New York. That painting's commission is unclear; we do know who he was, and his hands are folded rather than joined in prayer, the vastly usual positing for a donor panel.

The painting was in Paris in 1910, when it was sold to C. von Hollitscher of Berlin. From there it passed into the von Auspitz collection in Vienna until 1931. It was acquired by the art dealer Bachstitz who sold it to Percy S. Straus in 1934. The painting was is bequeathed to the Museum of Fine Arts in 1944.

Notes

Sources

 Panofsky, Erwin. Early Netherlandish Painting. London: Harper Collins, 1953. 
 De Vos, Dirk. Hans Memling: The Complete Works. Ghent: Harry N Abrams, 1994. 

1470s paintings
Elderly Woman
Paintings in the collection of the Museum of Fine Arts, Houston
Elderly Woman